Rice Creek is a tributary of the Mississippi River in the northern suburbs of the Minneapolis–St. Paul metropolitan area of Minnesota in the United States.

Course
Rice Creek has its source at Clear Lake in the city of Forest Lake in Washington County and flows generally southwestwardly through Anoka and Ramsey Counties, through the cities of Columbus, Lino Lakes, Circle Pines, Shoreview, Arden Hills, Mounds View, New Brighton and Fridley.

In Anoka County, Rice Creek passes through an extensive network of lakes known as the Lino Lakes Chain of Lakes, a portion of which is preserved in the Rice Creek Chain of Lakes Regional Park Reserve, a regional park maintained by the government of Anoka County. In New Brighton, the creek passes through Long Lake, which is bordered by Long Lake Regional Park, maintained by Ramsey County.  In Fridley, the lower course of creek is roughly paralleled by the Rice Creek West Regional Trail, a biking and hiking trail.

Both tributaries join Rice Creek in Anoka County as part of the chain of lakes.

History
According to the Minnesota Historical Society, Rice Creek was named for Henry Mower Rice, one of the first pair of U.S. Senators sent to represent Minnesota upon its statehood, who acquired extensive lands near the lower course of the creek in 1849, though Edmund Rice describes Rice Brook in St. Paul as the "Rice Creek" named after his brother Henry Mower Rice. Rice Creek was known in Dakota as "Psin ta wak pa dan" or Psiŋta wakpadaŋ, meaning "Wild Rice Rivulet". Early surveys conducted by Joseph Nicollet record the name of Rice Creek as "Ottonwey River" or Atoonowe-ziibi in the Ojibwe language meaning "River for making Canoes." However, its Ojibwe language name has also been recorded as "Manominikan Sibi" or Manoominikaan-ziibi, meaning "river full of wild rice," which is known to have grown plentifully in the lakes of the watershed.  Nicollet described the creek as: "At 2:45, as we left the islands behind, a rivulet about thirty feet wide entered the river from the left. Its shores are adorned with beautiful white lilies.  Chagobay told me that it winds back to the vicinity of the Falls of the St. Croix River, being separated from the latter by only a short portage. Its course links several lakes, while irrigating a land abundant with wild rice where the Sioux gather their yearly provisions. The Sioux call it in their language Wild Rice River, and the Chippewa Manominikan Sibi, which means river where one reaps wild rice."  "Manomin" (wild rice) was also the basis for the naming of the former Manomin County, which later was incorporated into Anoka County and ultimately became, in part, the city of Fridley, where the creek joins the Mississippi River.

Archaeological evidence exists that suggests ancestors of the Sioux hunted and fished in the vicinity of Bald Eagle Lake (approximately present-day White Bear Township) in the Rice Creek watershed, and had a summer village in the present-day city of Centerville as early as 2000 B.C.

A series of burial mounds (one linear and twelve conical) on the north side of Centerville Lake along the creek's course through Centerville are believed to have been built by people of the Mississippian culture who arrived in the area around the year 1400.

Watershed

The Rice Creek watershed drains portions of Anoka, Hennepin, Ramsey, and Washington Counties:
Anoka County - 
Hennepin County - less than 
Ramsey County - 
Washington County - 

The watershed occupies portions of the following jurisdictions:

Twenty-eight lakes in the watershed exceed  in size.

The Rice Creek Watershed District was established in 1972 to "conserve and restore the water resources of the District for the beneficial use of current and future generations."  It is a governmental organization managed by a Board of Managers appointed by the county commissions of Anoka, Ramsey, and Washington Counties.

See also
List of Minnesota rivers

References

External links
Rice Creek Watershed District

Rivers of Minnesota
Fridley, Minnesota
Tributaries of the Mississippi River
Rivers of Anoka County, Minnesota
Rivers of Ramsey County, Minnesota
Rivers of Washington County, Minnesota